Postal codes in Bangladesh are assigned to one of seven divisions: Nanarayaganj, Mymensingh, Sylhet, Chattogram, Rangpur, Rajshahi, or Barishal.comilla

External links
 Bangladesh - Find Post Codes
 Bangladesh - Uncommon Postal code
 Postal Code Services Worldwide- including Bangladesh 

Postal codes
Postal system of Bangladesh
Bangladesh
Postal codes by country